Polbase (DNA Polymerase Database) is an open repository of DNA polymerase information.  Polbase captures information from published research on polymerase activity, and presents it in context with related work.  Polbase indexes over 5,000 references  from the 1950s to the present and includes hundreds of polymerases and their related mutants. Polbase's collaborative model allows polymerase investigators to complete, correct and validate Polbase's representation of their work.

Content 
Polbase features a listing of known polymerases categorized by organism, polymerase family, and selected properties.  Each indexed polymerase has its own snapshot page containing links to all its information in the database. All results in Polbase are stored with the relevant experimental details to put them into context. If structure information is available, Polbase links to the polymerase's  Protein Data Bank (PDB) entry. All information gathered in Polbase is linked to the original publication where it was reported.

Features 
 Polymerases by family, organism and properties
 Search by author, organism, polymerase name, property, etc.
 Browsing by reference
 Browsing by author
 Browsing by organism

Information sources 
Polbase draws information from a variety of sources including PubMed, PDB, and directly from polymerase investigators.

Interconnections 
Polbase is connected with various other databases.  These include:
 The Protein Data Bank
 European Bioinformatics Institute
 ExPASy Bioinformatics Resource Portal
 UniProt
 BRENDA
 PubMed
 Various Scientific Journals

History 
Polbase began in March 2009 with a grant from the NIH's SBIR program and was first presented to the public at MIT's DNA and Mutagenesis Meeting 
In March 2010 Polbase was presented to a larger audience at the Evolving Polymerases 2010 Conference.
Polbase was also presented in more technical detail at the Rocky 2010 ISMB Conference.
Polbase is described in more detail in the 2012 Nucleic Acids Research Database Issue.

Polbase was built at New England Biolabs by Brad Langhorst and Nicole Nichols with the help of founding collaborators Linda Reha-Krantz, Bill Jack, Cathy Joyce, Stu Linn, Stefan Sarafianos, Sam Wilson, and Roger Woodgate.

References

External links 
 The DNA Polymerase Database (Polbase)

Biological databases
DNA replication